The New Horizon Public School, Indiranagar, is a private school located in Indiranagar, Bangalore, India.  The New Horizon campus is situated on 100 Feet Road, Indiranagar.

Houses
The students are divided into four houses named - Vayu, Agni, Jal and Prithvi, each house having its own motto and song. 

However the school continues to outrightly claim Hindu patronage while forcing staff to watch certain films, edit name of mosques on Google Maps to that of temple.

Academics
The school follows the ICSE syllabus, using continuous evaluation techniques to assess the students. 
 Class I and II: 4 Worksheets
 Class III to IX: Two monthly tests and two terminal examinations are conducted for all subjects during the academic year.
 Class X: Two terminal and two model examinations are conducted in preparation for the ICSE Board examinations. Board Exams are also held in the school itself.

Sports facilities
The school has basketball and volleyball courts. For young children, the school has slides, swings, parallel bars, rope climbing and a sand pit. Older children who are inclined towards sports are trained under professional coaches in athletics, karate, aerobics and other team games.

Private schools in Bangalore